Freddie and the Dreamers were an English beat band that had a number of hit records between 1963 and 1965. The band's stage act was enlivened by the comic antics of Freddie Garrity, who would bounce around the stage with arms and legs flying.

History 
The band, formed in March 1962 in West Didsbury, Manchester, consisted of vocalist Freddie Garrity (1936–2006), guitarist Roy Crewdson (born 1941), guitarist/harmonica player Derek Quinn (1942–2020), bassist Peter Birrell, and drummer Bernie Dwyer (1940–2002). Although the band was grouped as part of the Merseybeat sound phenomenon centered around Liverpool, they came from Manchester. Prior to becoming a singer, Garrity had worked as a milkman in Manchester and bassist Birrell was a shoe salesman.

They had four Top 10 UK hits: a cover of James Ray's hit "If You Gotta Make a Fool of Somebody", which reached number 3 in the UK Singles Chart in mid-1963, "I'm Telling You Now" (number 2 in August), "You Were Made for Me" (number 3 in November) and a cover of The G-Clefs' "I Understand", which hit the number 5 spot in November 1964.

Their eponymous debut album was released in the United Kingdom in 1963, peaking at number five in the UK Albums Chart and reaching number 19 in the US albums chart on May 22, 1965. It was the only LP by the group to chart in America. Their subsequent four albums in the UK failed to chart.

On stage, the group performed rehearsed, synchronised wacky dance routines. They appeared in four British films: What a Crazy World with Joe Brown, Just for You, Cuckoo Patrol with Kenneth Connor and Victor Maddern and Every Day's A Holiday (US title Seaside Swingers) with Mike Sarne, Ron Moody and John Leyton.

Between 1968 and 1973, Garrity and Birrell appeared in the UK ITV children's show Little Big Time, a zany music/talent/adventure show with audience participation.

Garrity and Birrell formed a new version of Freddie and the Dreamers in the mid-1970s, releasing three albums on the Arny's Shack label in 1976, 1978 and 1983, although Birrell had left before the third release.

Legacy 
In the 1980 Rolling Stone History of Rock & Roll, Lester Bangs wrote of the group:

Founding members 
Freddie Garrity – vocals (1962–2000; died 2006)
Derek Quinn – lead guitar (1962–1971; died 2020)
Roy Crewdson – rhythm guitar (1962–1971)
Pete Birrell – bass (1962–1971; 1974–1980s)
Bernie Dwyer – drums (1962–1971; died 2002)

Discography

See also 
 Beat music

References

External links 
 Freddie Garrity Birthday Tribute – 14 November 2011
 The New Dreamers

1963 establishments in England
2000 disestablishments in England
English pop music groups
Musical groups from Manchester
Beat groups
British Invasion artists
Musical groups established in 1963
Musical groups disestablished in 2000
Columbia Graphophone Company artists